The 1980 NAIA men's basketball tournament was held in March at Kemper Arena in Kansas City, Missouri. The 43rd annual NAIA basketball tournament featured 32 teams playing in a single-elimination format.

Awards and honors
Leading scorer:
Leading rebounder:
Player of the Year: est. 1994

1980 NAIA bracket

  * denotes overtime.

Third-place game
The third-place game featured the losing teams from the national semifinalist to determine 3rd and 4th places in the tournament. This game was played until 1988.

See also
1980 NCAA Division I basketball tournament
1980 NCAA Division II basketball tournament
1980 NCAA Division III basketball tournament

References

NAIA Men's Basketball Championship
Tournament
NAIA men's basketball tournament
NAIA men's basketball tournament
College basketball tournaments in Missouri
Basketball competitions in Kansas City, Missouri